The Lottery is a 1989 American comedy short film starring Bette Midler and directed by Garry Marshall which was shown at the then Disney-MGM Studios in line for the first versions of the Studio Backlot Tour.

Plot 
Bette Midler stars as a music teacher giving a singing lesson to a student in her apartment. She suddenly wins the lottery but quickly loses the ticket when it is swept out her window by a gust of wind and subsequently chases the ticket all over New York City.  A pigeon helps retrieve it for her and she spends some of her winnings to buy a golden statue of the pigeon.

Production 
The Lottery was shot on February 3, 1989 at Disney-MGM Studios on the New York City backlot set and it took a crew of over 100 people to produce.

It was the first film to be completely filmed at the Disney-MGM Studios theme park.

It was used to demonstrate general filmmaking, the use of exterior sets and soundstage sets, special effects and stunts.

See also 
 List of Disney live-action shorts
 List of Disney's Hollywood Studios attractions

References

External links 

1989 films
1989 short films
1989 comedy films
American short films
Amusement rides introduced in 1989
Disney's Hollywood Studios
Former Walt Disney Parks and Resorts attractions
Walt Disney Parks and Resorts films
Films about educators
Films directed by Garry Marshall
Films set in New York City
Films shot in New York City
Films produced by Debra Hill
Films about lotteries
1980s English-language films